Walter "Lefty" Lienert (January 10, 1925 – July 1, 2012) was an American gymnastics coach and judge. He was inducted into the USA Gymnastics Hall of Fame in 1974.

References

1925 births
2012 deaths
American gymnasts
American gymnastics coaches
20th-century American people